The Toyota T100 is a full-size pickup truck produced by Toyota between 1992 and 1998. It was developed strictly for the US (and Canadian) markets, where larger pickups have a sizable market share.

History

As Toyota firmly established itself in the North American compact pickup truck market in the 1980s through 1990s, the company decided to offer a truck that was larger than the compact so as to offer an alternative to the traditional North American full-size pickup truck market. North American Toyota dealers had long been clamoring for a full-sized Toyota truck, especially in light of the high percentage of Toyota Pickup owners who moved on to domestic full-sized trucks. The T100 reflected a philosophy of designing products specifically for localized international markets, where traditional products sold and made in Japan wouldn't sell well. This approach is also demonstrated with the introduction of the mid-size Toyota Camry (XV10) which was larger than the compact Toyota Camry (V30) in 1991, and again in 1997 when the Toyota Sienna replaced the slow selling Toyota Previa.

Rumored for many years before, the 1993 Toyota T100 boasted a full-size (8 ft) pickup bed but retained the engine and suspension setup of its smaller and older sibling, the compact Toyota Truck. Although the T100 was a bit larger than the competitive mid-size Dodge Dakota, it was still markedly smaller than full-size American pickup trucks of the time. This meant that the T100 occupied its own niche in the truck market. Before introducing the T100, the company reflected on its history of commercial truck manufacture and products they offered in the past. Past products started with the Toyota G1, the Toyota FA, the Toyota BX, the Toyota Stout, the Toyota ToyoAce, and the Toyota Dyna, and its market successes with their Hino Division. Though economical, reliable and practical, the T100 was slow to be accepted by traditional buyers of full-size competitors, while it was larger than both the Toyota Truck followed by the Toyota Tacoma compact trucks. Wary of the market pushback of competing directly with the Big Three, Toyota chose this somewhat smaller size (and limited lineup) so as not to risk blowback and import quotas. The T100 was designed and engineered for the North American market and was not sold in Japan.

Although sales were slow at the start, the T100 sales did reach into the mid 40,000 vehicles sold range (1996) in the United States. Sales of the Chevrolet C/K were roughly 700,000 per year, while sales of the Ford F-Series surged from 550,000 to nearly 850,000 and Dodge went from 100,000 to 400,000 with the introduction of the new Dodge Ram in 1993. Sales of the T100 fell approximately 30 percent when the new Ram went on the market in October 1993, 11 months after the T100's launch in November 1992.

Reception
Upon introduction, the T100 was criticized for being too small to appeal to buyers of full-size work trucks, the lack of an extended cab, and the lack of a V8 engine; with the only available engine was a 3.0 liter V6, which was already found in Toyota's compact trucks and in the 4Runner. Although considered criticisms by many, Toyota stated these were all factors that were taken into consideration when designing and producing the T100. They claimed the smaller size was planned to offer a larger truck with a compact "feel", an Xtracab was on the horizon and the 3.0 liter V6 would provide far better fuel economy than the vehicles it aspired to rival. Both the V6 engine and the somewhat smaller dimensions were influenced by environmental concerns, issues that were irrelevant to American pickup buyers.

Despite the criticisms of size and horsepower, the T100 was also praised by the media, acquiring J.D. Power and Associates Initial Quality Survey "Best Full-Size Pickup" award and the "Best of What's New" award by Popular Science magazine in its first year on the market. The T100 was the first vehicle – car or truck – ever to receive an "Initial Quality Survey Award" in its first year of production. For 1994 (the truck's second model year) and 1995 (the third), the T100 was again awarded "Best Full-Size Pickup in Initial Quality" by J.D. Power and Associates. In 1997 the T100 was awarded "Top Three Vehicles in Initial Quality – Full-Size Segment" once again by J.D. Power and Associates.

Design
The T100 was the first imported pickup truck that could carry a 4 by 8 feet plywood sheet between the wheelwells. The regular cab could seat three abreast in the front bench seat; this was split on the SR5 model. Automatics received a column shift while manuals were floor mounted, where the transfer case shifter was also located on 4WD models.

An Xtracab model came along several months into the 1995 model year as well, sitting on the same  wheelbase with a  bed. This provided a boost in sales of 150 percent for 1995. The T100 received only minor changes throughout its run, aside from the engine changes and the Xtracab addition. A driver-side airbag was installed for MY 1994 (a passenger-side airbag never became available), and larger 16-inch wheels became the norm for most of the 4X4 models starting in 1996. It was evident by late 1996/ early 1997 that Toyota was already investing in its next truck (what ultimately became the Toyota Tundra). At the time (late 1990s) some believed a revamped T100 with a V8 engine was on the way, and there were some reports that altered V8 powered T100s were used as test-mules, but ultimately it never came to pass, and the T100 was superseded by the Toyota Tundra.

Toyota Racing Development (TRD) introduced a supercharger for the 3.4-liter engine in 1996 and it became available for the T100, the Tacoma and the 4Runner with the 3.4-liter V6 (and later the Tundra). This power add on was available for 1997–1998 T100s only. Earlier 3.4 V6 powered T100s have different computer and electrical layouts which do not support the TRD device.

The T100 was manufactured and partially engineered by Toyota-subsidiary Hino. Three trim lines were offered: the base model, the DX, and the top-of-the-line SR5. The maximum towing capacity was 5,200 lb (2,360 kg) and the truck had a payload limit of 2,450 pounds. Although most trucks fell within the 1/2 ton category, a 1-ton model was offered (in two-wheel drive form) for several of its earlier years until finally being dropped because of a lack of interest.

All T100s were assembled in Tokyo, Japan and as a result were subject to a 25% import tariff on all imported light trucks. The T100 was the last Japanese-built Toyota pickup made for North America when production ceased in July 1998, sales being phased out in August and ending with the 1998 model year. The T100 was replaced by the larger V8-powered Tundra which debuted in 1999. Toyota had originally planned to continue the T100 naming system by calling the new truck the "Toyota T-150"; Ford made a successful claim that this was a trademark infringement of their F-150 and the name had to be changed.

Year-by-year changes

MY 1993
Standard cab, long bed only
3.0 liter V6 engine only (150 horsepower –  of torque)

MY 1994
Driver's side airbag added
2.7 liter I4 engine added to lineup (150 horsepower –  of torque)

MY 1995
3.4 liter V6 engine added to lineup (190 horsepower –  of torque)
3.0 liter V6 discontinued
Xtracab model added to lineup
Last year for the regular cab 4X4 model

MY 1996
Color changes

MY 1997
Larger 16 inch wheel added to lineup
Color changes
TRD introduces 3.4 liter V6 supercharger (approx. 245 horsepower –  of torque)

MY 1998
Last year for the T100
Color changes

Gallery

References

All-wheel-drive vehicles
Pickup trucks
Rear-wheel-drive vehicles
T100
Cars introduced in 1992